Attila Bíró (born 9 May 1966) is a former Hungarian water polo player. In 2015 he was named Head Coach of Hungary women's national water polo team winning the gold medal at the 2016 Women's European Water Polo Championship in Belgrade, Serbia.

References

External links
 

1966 births
Living people
Sportspeople from Eger
Hungarian male water polo players
Hungarian water polo coaches
Hungary women's national water polo team coaches
Water polo coaches at the 2016 Summer Olympics
Water polo coaches at the 2020 Summer Olympics